Hideaway is a largely residential city and gated community in Smith County, Texas, United States. As of the 2020 census, the population was 3,201.

Hideaway is part of the Tyler Metropolitan Statistical Area.

History
The land that now encompasses Hideaway was originally included in the large plantation owned by Texas governor Richard B. Hubbard. Later, the land was purchased by developer James Fair. In 1967, Fair planned and developed the land, naming it "Hide-A-Way Lake." The community was slated to contain  with a total 1,944 residential lots. In 2000, the community, then managed by Hideaway Homeowners, Inc. (which is the HOA) and Hideaway Lake Club, Inc. (which operates the golfing facilities) merged, forming a municipal corporation known as Hideaway Lake Club, Inc.

Demographics

As of the 2020 United States census, there were 3,201 people, 1,470 households, and 1,067 families residing in the city. There is a poverty rate of about 6% and an individual income of around $32,000. Most households in Hideaway earn 75 to 125 thousand dollars. The most common individual income is 15 to 25 thousand dollars. Most people in Hideaway were born in the USA and are married. The median age in Hideaway is around 63, which gives Hideaway the third largest median age in Texas.

Education
The Lindale Independent School District serves area students.

References

External links

Cities in Texas
Cities in Smith County, Texas